Angelo Grizzetti (14 May 1916 – 20 December 1998) was an Italian-born French footballer and coach.

He played for Sochaux, RC Paris, Angoulême and CA Paris.

After his playing career, he became a coach with Monaco, Red Star, CA Paris, Angoulême and Racing Paris-Neuilly.

External links and references

 

1916 births
1998 deaths
French footballers
Italian emigrants to France
FC Sochaux-Montbéliard players
Racing Club de France Football players
Angoulême Charente FC players
Ligue 1 players
Ligue 2 players
French football managers
AS Monaco FC managers
Red Star F.C. managers
Angoulême Charente FC managers
US Boulogne managers
CA Paris-Charenton managers
Association football midfielders